Bokin may refer to:

Bokin, Bam, Burkina Faso
Bokin, Boulkiemdé, Burkina Faso
Bokin Department, in Passoré Province, Burkina Faso
Bokin, Passoré, the capital of the above department